The 2005 European Seniors Fencing Championships were held in Zalaegerszeg, Hungary from 27 June to 3 July 2005.

Overview

Medal table

Results

Men

Foil individual

Épée individual

Sabre individual

Foil team

Épée team

Sabre team

Women

Foil individual

Épée individual

Sabre individual

Foil team

Épée team

Sabre team

References
 2005 European Seniors Fencing Championship official results
 Annual Report of the Executive Committee of the International Fencing Federation

E
Fencing
European Fencing Championships
Sport in Zalaegerszeg
International fencing competitions hosted by Hungary
June 2005 sports events in Europe
July 2005 sports events in Europe